Mark–n–Marshall: Tuesday is an album by saxophonist Marshall Allen, his second as a leader. It was recorded at The Spirit Room in Rossie, New York on March 16 and 17, 1998, and was released later that year by CIMP. On the album, which is the companion to Mark–n–Marshall: Monday, Allen is joined by saxophonist and clarinetist Mark Whitecage, bassist Dominic Duval, and drummer Luqman Ali.

Reception

The authors of The Penguin Guide to Jazz Recordings stated that, in relation to Mark–n–Marshall: Monday, Tuesday "is just as good, but one senses that, the introductions over, the chemistry isn't quite as intense." However, they noted: "'Altobatics' is as close to a showpiece as Allen has released, and 'My Funny Valentine' will challenge any blindfold testee."

John Murph, writing for Jazz Times, wrote: "In... Whitecage, Allen has found a kindred spirit, one who can dance around and intersect through Allen's oblique passages... Bassist Dominic Duval and drummer Luqman Ali provide a supple rhythm section that gently pushes Allen and Whitecage forward while simultaneously adding rich colors and textures... Mark–n–Marshall: Tuesday... softly piques the curiosities of those wanting to hear this great altoist outside of Sun Ra's outer-spaceways."

Track listing

 "Yesterday's Flowers" (Dominic Duval, Luqman Ali, Mark Whitecage, Marshall Allen) – 8:38
 "Well, You Needn't" (Thelonious Monk) – 8:42
 "Opus Springtime" (Sun Ra) – 5:54
 "Something About J.C." (Mark Whitecage) – 6:45
 "Duval Calling" (Dominic Duval, Luqman Ali, Mark Whitecage, Marshall Allen) – 7:41
 "East of South" (Dominic Duval, Luqman Ali, Mark Whitecage, Marshall Allen) – 9:49
 "My Funny Valentine" (Richard Rodgers, Lorenz Hart) – 9:43
 "Altobatics" (Dominic Duval, Luqman Ali, Mark Whitecage, Marshall Allen) – 5:07

Personnel 
 Marshall Allen – alto saxophone
 Mark Whitecage – clarinet, alto saxophone
 Dominic Duval – double bass
 Luqman Ali – drums

References

1998 albums
Marshall Allen albums
Free jazz albums
CIMP albums